Eruca Sativa is an Argentine alternative rock band formed in 2007. The band consists of Luisina "Lula" Bertoldi (guitar and vocals), Brenda Martin (bass and vocals) and Gabriel Pedernera (drums and vocals). The band has released six studio albums and has received several awards and nominations including four Gardel Awards and six Latin Grammy Award nominations.

Career
The band started in 2007 with the three members, Lula Bertoldi, Brenda Martin and Gabriel Pedernera, having previous experiences in music, Pedernera had played in a jazz group with Martin while Martin had also been a part of a rock band with Bertoldi. The band's name Eruca Sativa roughly means "Wild Caterpillar" in latin and was chosen by the band to reflect their insterest in the metaphorical significance of the metamorphosis that caterpillars go through. During 2007, they made their first performances in Córdoba, the city where the band was formed, and in 2008 they released an EP with songs like "Frío Cemento", "Lo Que No Ves No Es", "Foco" and "Eleanor Rigby" that later would be included in their debut album La Carne (2008), released the same year. The album had to be re-edited in 2010 after the original edition sold out.

On August 20, 2010, the band released their second album Es (2010), with collaborations with Argentine singers Titi Rivarola and David Lebón, the album was recorded at MLC Records and was presented at the bar Willie Dixon, one of the main venues of Rosario and was later performed at several cities in Argentina such as San Juan, Mendoza, La Plata and Buenos Aires. Their third album Blanco (2012) was released on November 1, 2012 through Sony Music, being their first album with the global music company, the album features a collaboration with Argentine singer Fito Páez and was recorded in MLC Records like their previous records, the project received a nomination for Best Rock Album at the 14th Latin Grammy Awards. In 2014, the band released their first live album Huellas Digitales (2014) on October 21, 2014, the album was recorded in two performances at the Teatro Opera in Buenos Aires in August 1 and 2 of 2014 and consists of songs from their three previous albums.

After the pregnancies of Bertoldi and Martin, the band started to record their fifth album Barro y Fauna (2016) in Buenos Aires which was released on November 25, 2016, the project had several guest artists and producers such as Gustavo Santaolalla, Nicolás Sorín, Juan Pablo Rufino, Rodrigo Crespo, Pablo Tremsal, Aníbal Kerpel, Adrian Sosa and Tavo Cortes from Sig Ragga. At the Latin Grammy Awards, the singles "Nada Salvaje" and "Armas Gemelas" received nominations for Best Rock Song in 2016 and 2017 respectively while the album was nominated for Best Rock Album, their second nomination in that category. At the 19th Annual Gardel Awards, the album won Best Rock Group Album and Adrian Sosa won Production of the Year for his work in the album.

In 2017, to celebrate the ten years of the band they released an EP named EP Vivo consisting of four live performances recorded at the Luna Park in Buenos Aires, three songs from Barro y Fauna and a live version of "Amor Ausente" from Blanco. On November 10, 2019, their sixth album Seremos Primavera (2019), was released. For the project, the band received three nominations at the 21st Annual Latin Grammy Awards, Best Rock Album for Seremos Primavera, Best Rock Song for "Creo" and Best Alternative Song for "Caparazón".

Style and influences
Among their musical influences, the band mentions artists such as Les Claypool, Primus, Jimi Hendrix, Gustavo Cerati, System of a Down, Soda Stereo, Divididos, Rage Against the Machine and Red Hot Chili Peppers. During the recording of their third album, Blanco (2012), the band listened to the rock supergroup Them Crooked Vultures.

Discography
 La Carne (2008)
 Es (2010)
 Blanco (2012)
 Huellas Digitales (2014)
 Barro y Fauna (2016)
 Seremos Primavera (2019)

Awards and nominations

Gardel Awards

Note: Adrian Sosa won Producer of the Year at the 19th Annual Gardel Awards for his production in Barro y Fauna.

Latin Grammy Awards

References

External links
Official website

Argentine musical groups
Argentine rock music groups
Rock en Español music groups